Gong Qiuxia, also romanized as Kung Chiu-hsia (4 December 1918 – 7 September 2004) was a Chinese actress and singer. By the 1940s, she became one of the seven great singing stars.

Biography
In 1933, she traveled across Southeast Asia as a member of the Shanghai Plum Flower Troupe. One of the theatrical plays she took part in was the Five Tiger Generals. As a result of her training, she was an accomplished tap dancer. Her early films would capitalize on this talent as one of the few Chinese female stars who was a triple-threat (acting, singing, dancing). People would affectionately refer to her as an older Shirley Temple.

In 1946, she moved to Hong Kong with her husband. They later moved to Taipei, Taiwan, in 1967.

She died on 7 September 2004 in Hong Kong exactly ten years before fellow Seven great singing star Li Xianglan.

Career
In 1936, she made her first film (Father Mother Son Daughter). In 1937, she starred in the movie  and began taking a relatively serious attitude toward filmmaking.  She is most recognized for playing the mature, housewife image.

From 1938 to 1980, she took part in a number of movies.  The movie  (Four Daughters) would earn her the nickname "Big Sister."

In the 1930s, she was recognized as one of the three great mandopop singers with Zhou Xuan and Bai Hong.

Filmography
 (1936)
，()，()，() (1937)
，() (1938)
，() (1939)
，()，() (1941)
，()，()，()，() (1942)
，()，()，()，()，()，() (1943)
，() (1945)
 (1946)
，() (1947)
，()，()，() (1949)
，()，()，() (1950)
，()，() (1951)
，()，()，() (1952)
，()，()，() (1953)
，()，()，()，()，() (1955)
，() (1956)
，()，()，()，()，() (1957)
，()，()，()，()，() (1958)
，()，() (1959)
，()，() (1960)
，()，() (1961)
，() (1962)
，()，() (1963)
，() (1965)
，() (1966)
 (1978)
 (1980)

References

External links
 
 Actress at China's Movie Database
 Zydgnet Info

1918 births
2004 deaths
Chinese film actresses
Singers from Shanghai
Chinese Civil War refugees
Chinese sopranos
20th-century Chinese actresses
Actresses from Shanghai
20th-century Chinese women singers
Chinese emigrants to British Hong Kong
Pathé Records (China) artists